The East Frisian Geest is a natural region major unit group (not quite synonymous with a "major  region of the third level") in northwest Germany and northwestern Lower Saxony. Its character consists in the very varied juxtaposition of different landscape elements of the Northern Lowlands of which the East Frisian Geest is a part.

Location and boundaries 
The major unit group lies on the territory of the East Frisian counties of Aurich, Leer and Wittmund, the Oldenburg counties of Friesland, Ammerland, Oldenburg and Cloppenburg, the city of Oldenburg and the county of Emsland.

References 

Geography of Lower Saxony
North German Plain